Khvorkosh (also Romanized as Khowrkosh) is a village in Simakan Rural District, in the Central District of Bavanat County, Fars Province, Iran. At the 2006 census, its population was 247, in 67 families.

References 

Populated places in Bavanat County